Paradela may refer to

Places in Portugal
 Paradela (Barcelos), a civil parish in the municipality of Barcelos
 Paradela (Chaves), a civil parish in the municipality of Chaves
 Paradela (Miranda do Douro), a civil parish in the municipality of Miranda do Douro
 Paradela (Mogadouro), a civil parish in the municipality of Mogadouro
 Paradela (Montalegre), a civil parish in the municipality of Montalegre
 Paradela (Penacova), a civil parish in the municipality of Penacova
 Paradela (Sever do Vouga), a civil parish in the municipality of Sever do Vouga
 Paradela (Tabuaço), a civil parish in the municipality of Tabuaço

Other
Paradela (surname)
 Paradela, Lugo, a municipality in Galicia, Spain